Hemidactylus lopezjuradoi is a species of gecko, a lizard in the family Gekkonidae. The species is endemic to the Cape Verde Islands.

Geographic range
In the Cape Verde Islands H. lopezjuradoi has only been found on the island of Fogo.

Etymology
The specific name, lopezjuradoi, is in honor of Spanish herpetologist Luis Felipe López-Jurado.

Description

Reproduction
H. lopezjuradoi is oviparous.

References

lopezjuradoi
Geckos of Africa
Endemic vertebrates of Cape Verde
Fauna of Fogo, Cape Verde
Reptiles described in 2008
Taxa named by Edwin Nicholas Arnold